Tomáš Zahradníček (born 11 August 1993) is a professional Czech football player who currently plays for SK Sigma Olomouc.

References

External links
 
 

1993 births
Living people
Czech footballers
Czech Republic youth international footballers
Czech Republic under-21 international footballers
Association football midfielders
Czech First League players
SK Sigma Olomouc players